The expedition of Khalid ibn al-Walid  to Nakhla took place in January 630 AD, 8AH, in the 9th month of the Islamic Calendar.

Khalid ibn al-Walid was sent to destroy the image of the Goddess al-Uzza which was worshipped by polytheists; he did this successfully.

Expedition and demolition of Temple

Soon after the Conquest of Mecca, Muhammad began to dispatch expeditions on errands aiming at eliminating the last symbols reminiscent of pre-Islamic practices.

He sent Khalid bin Al-Walid in Ramadan 8 A.H. to a place called Nakhlah, where there was an idol of the goddess called Al-‘Uzza worshipped by the Quraish and Kinanah tribes, and guarded by custodians from Banu Shaiban. Khalid, at the head of thirty horsemen, arrived at the spot and destroyed the idol.

Upon his return, Muhammad asked him if he had seen anything else there, to which Khalid replied, "No". He was told that the idol had not been destroyed and that he must go back and fulfill the task. Khalid went again to Nakhlah and there saw a black Abyssinian (Ethiopian) woman, naked with disheveled hair. He struck her with his sword and cut her into "two pieces", according to the Muslim scholar, Saifur Rahman al Mubarakpuri. He returned once again and narrated his story to Muhammad, who then confirmed the fulfillment of the task, saying that the black Ethiopian woman was the real "al-Uzza".

See also
Military career of Muhammad

Notes

630
Campaigns ordered by Muhammad
Persecution of Pagans
Persecution by Muslims